In Like Flint is a 1967 American spy fi comedy film directed by Gordon Douglas, the sequel to the parody spy film Our Man Flint (1966).

It posits an international feminist conspiracy to depose the ruling American patriarchy with a feminist matriarchy. To achieve and establish this plan, they kidnap and replace the U.S. President, discredit the head of the Z.O.W.I.E. intelligence agency, and commandeer a nuclear-armed space platform, all directed from Fabulous Face, a women's beauty farm in the Virgin Islands. Circumstances compel ex-secret agent Derek Flint to help his ex-boss, and so uncover the conspiracy.

James Coburn and Lee J. Cobb reprise their roles as Derek Flint and spy chief Lloyd C. Cramden, Flint's ex-boss, respectively. Jerry Goldsmith, who wrote the score for Our Man Flint, also returns. The ad campaign features poster artwork by Bob Peak. The title is a play on the phrase "in like Flynn."

This film and Caprice with Doris Day were the last films made in CinemaScope, with Fox and other studios moving to Panavision and other widescreen processes.

Plot

After observing the launch of a new space platform, Z.O.W.I.E. Chief Lloyd C. Cramden joins President Trent for a game of golf. Their game is interrupted by a small group, two women disguised as boys and an actor disguised as an old man, all from the Fabulous Face organization. Substituting the presidential golf ball with a small gas bomb, they succeed in temporarily immobilizing the presidential party and replacing the president with the now-undisguised actor, who has been surgically altered to look exactly like him. The Fabulous Face organization plans to gain control of the world and run it entirely by a group of women led by an influential female triumvirate in fashions, cosmetics and mass communications. Cramden has inadvertently stumbled upon this world-domination plot. The women want to establish a matriarchy, and the first step in their plan is to gain control of a US space facility in the Virgin Islands. Elisabeth has established the spa there as a cover. The women establish their headquarters near the rocket base to brainwash their male-oriented sisters by planting tape recorders in their hair dryers.

Puzzled by an apparent three-minute time discrepancy—revealed by a perusal of a stopwatch that was active during the switch—Cramden visits the former super agent Derek Flint at his New York City home. Greeted by Flints' three female live-in companions in the living room of Flint's spacious Manhattan apartment, Cramden is informed that Flint is experimenting with the creation of a dolphin language dictionary. Flint tells Cramden these undersea mammals are intelligent creatures and that they use sounds or sonics to communicate, a notion that had been only relatively recently reinforced by scientific experimentation at the time the film was produced. Flint then shows Cramden a sonic device of his own invention that is integrated into a cigarette lighter (and that, amongst many other uses mentioned—82 are claimed for the gadget—is later revealed to serve as a belt buckle), first moving and then shattering a white cue ball on the pool table. Cramden requests that Flint investigate the "lost" three minutes recorded by the stopwatch. Flint agrees to take up the matter after his return from a survival exercise in the Mojave Desert. During their meeting, Lisa Norton, an operative of Fabulous Face, is meeting with Flint's three live-in girl friends, where she tricks the girls into accepting a free visit to the Fabulous Face Spa in the Virgin Islands. That evening Cramden encounters Norton, whom Fabulous Face has re-tasked to deal with his unexpected interference with their plans, at an Italian restaurant. Disguised as a southern schoolteacher visiting the city, she drugs him using cigarettes treated with a soporific substance and stages a compromising scene with a prostitute at a hotel; the scene is then photographed and published under the auspices of General Carter, who is working with Fabulous Face. With Cramden framed as a libertine, the "imposter" President publicly suspends the disgraced spy chief from active duty.

Recalled from his exercise, Derek Flint hypnotizes Cramden with his watch, which incorporates lights specifically designed for such a purpose, and learns the details of the encounter with Lisa. Tests of trimmings from Cramden's mustache (secured through the use of the ubiquitous, multi-talented cigarette lighter) reveal traces of "euphoric acid", a drug that when mixed with alcohol leaves the subject mildly sedated and aroused. Investigating further, Flint breaks into Z.O.W.I.E. headquarters and discovers that the two astronauts on the recently launched space platform are, in fact, Russian female cosmonauts. Flint is interrupted by General Carter and a force of turncoat guards who, after a struggle, believe they have killed Flint when he apparently falls into a document incinerator.

Having actually escaped his supposed demise, Flint travels to the Soviet Union to investigate the cosmonaut connection. Dancing in the Bolshoi ballet, he makes contact with ballerina Natasha, unaware that she is a Fabulous Face operative until she attempts to drug him with soporific cigarettes, as Lisa Norton had done to Lloyd Cramden in New York. Flint manages to foil Natasha's designs, but his subsequent interrogation of her is interrupted by the KGB, who arrive at her apartment intending to bring Flint to the Soviet Premier. Flint escapes their clutches and leads the KGB agents in a chase across the roof, tricking one agent to looking over the ledge by imitating a pigeon (making cooing noises), then reaching up from his precarious perch beneath the building's eaves and pulling the man to his death. Flint, hopping atop roof again, evades the other agent and manages to propel a grappling hook, shot from his multi-purposed cigarette lighter, onto another nearby roof and, walking along the line he's secured at his end, crosses over and escapes into a lower vent hatch. Flint next sneaks into the Kremlin, where he overhears the Premier bluffing the (fake) U.S. President; conversational clues point Flint to the Fabulous Face spa in the Virgin Islands.

Cramden has also traveled to the Fabulous Face Spa to investigate further but he is captured and imprisoned with the real President. The Fabulous Face staff, in anticipation of Flint coming to the spa, have imprisoned his girl friends in cryogenic freezing chambers. Flint boards an Aeroflot flight for Cuba disguised as a bearded Cuban Revolutionary. An amusing scene ensues on the Russian airliner which pokes tongue-in-cheek fun at the idea of how an airline would be run in the Caribbean "socialist paradise". Distracting the other passengers, he ties up the pilots, parachutes out over the Virgin Islands, and swims to the Fabulous Face complex (with minor help from a wild dolphin). There, he is intercepted by Lisa Norton, who brings him before the Fabulous Face leadership, a group of female business executives who explain their plan to brainwash women (through the use of subliminal messages transmitted by salon hairdryers, as revealed in the film's opening scenes) into overthrowing the male-dominated political order. As Flint attempts to talk the women out of their plan, he is interrupted by General Carter, who is dissatisfied with his subordinate role in the women's plot and plans to take power himself with the aid of the fake president. After a fight, Flint is captured by Carter's men and placed, along with Cramden, the captive U. S. President, and the Fabulous Face leadership with their lead staff, into cryogenic suspension. Derek Flint escapes his freezing chamber, where he has been imprisoned with the lovely Miss Norton, with the sonic wave amplifier device he demonstrated to Cramden in his New York apartment. Subsequently, Flint decides to join sides with the women in stopping Carter's plan to atomically arm the space station. Flint, Cramden, the real President Trent, and the women of Fabulous Face travel to the nearby base where the launch is scheduled to take place. Once they arrive, the women execute "Operation Smooch", using their beauty and sexual allure to distract, seduce, and subdue the male guards. After the women thereby succeed in taking over the control room, Carter (who is on board the rocket) threatens to activate the atomic warheads under his control unless he is allowed to proceed with the launch. Flint manages to board the capsule just before it takes off; once in orbit he and Carter fight in zero gravity, causing the spacecraft to tumble. After overpowering Carter, Flint escapes the capsule, which is then destroyed with a nuclear missile launched from the surface. Using his wave amplifier, Flint floats to the nearby space platform, where he enjoys the hospitality of the resident female cosmonauts while awaiting return to Earth.

Cast

Bill Lear credited as W. P. Lear Sr.makes a cameo appearance as himself.

Production
Coburn later said Gordon Douglas "really didn't direct the film" saying Robert 'Buzz' Henry (Coburn's stunt double and a stunt arranger on the film), the director of photography (William H. Daniels) and myself were really responsible for the film. But that was the fun of it. Gordon Douglas was ill or had a heart problem or some damn thing. Anyway, he would come on the set and say what we were doing was wonderful and so on. Then he would often leave the set. Still it was fun. We had a great group of team players... the studio (Fox) really didn't support us with that concept. The script was also never finished. We actually started shooting without an ending to the film. The ending was tacked on the picture. Saul was working on a different ending, but the studio just wanted us to finish the film so they could release it. We had to shoot fast. We also had a pretty good budget. Most of the young women in the sequel were girlfriends of the execs working at the studio. It was playtime for those guys... The studio was very surprised by the success of the sequel. We said we might do more Flint films if the scripts were really good and if they hired top directors. Although Fox wanted us to do more Flint films, it just never worked out. They just didn't seem to care about quality anymore."

Our Man Flint co-screenwriter Ben Starr claimed he was asked to write the film but left after a dispute with Saul David over his salary.

Location scenes were shot in Jamaica.

Totty Ames, who played Simone, one of the female triumvirate, was the wife of producer Saul David.

Deleted scenes
The central plot of the film involves a missing three minutes of time. There were missing minutes of dialogue removed after the previews that created a dispute between Saul David and 20th Century Fox.
 
When Flint debates the fallacy of the women's plans he states,

The film's final line occurred when Flint romantically embraces the two female cosmonauts where he proclaims,

Soundtrack
Jerry Goldsmith returned to score the film, reusing his Our Man Flint theme. The song Your Zowie Face was composed by Goldsmith with lyrics by Leslie Bricusse.

Cover versions were performed by Nelson Riddle and Russell Malone.

Reception
The film earned $5 million in rentals in North America in 1967.

According to Fox records, the film needed to earn $6,975,000 in rentals to break even and made $9,125,000, meaning it made a profit.

Critical reaction
In Like Flint received mixed reviews when released in 1967; a New York Times critic said: "Although the film crawls with dime-store beauties, there is a noticeable lack of sexiness in it. Women bent on being tyrants evidently haven't much time for anything else".

Roger Ebert had similar criticisms: "The sexiest thing in the new Derek Flint misadventure, In Like Flint, is Flint's cigarette lighter, which is supposed to know eighty-two tricks, but actually delivers only five, of which, one is the not extraordinary ability to clip Lee J. Cobb's moustache".

The most lauded element of the film was easily the score, once again composed by Jerry Goldsmith. As critic Daniel Schweiger wrote in 2014, "There’s hep, insane energy to spare in Goldsmith’s delightful grooves, ostinato excitement and confident strings, especially when he roughhouses “Swan Lake”-style with bongo prancing, horn-slurring Russian dance moves. And even given the score’s way-lighter tone, there are also some dynamite two-fisted brass moves that Bond would envy."

On Rotten Tomatoes, the film holds a rating of 68% from 19 reviews.

In popular culture
In the movie Austin Powers: The Spy Who Shagged Me, the main character Austin Powers (while being on honeymoon with his new wife Vanessa Kensington) switches on the TV to a scene from In Like Flint. He mentions to Vanessa that it is his favorite movie. The phone in Austin's car has the same ringtone (but reversed) as the Z.O.W.I.E. telephone in the beginning of this film.

See also
List of American films of 1967
Outline of James Bond

References

External links
 
 
 

1967 films
20th Century Fox films
American sequel films
American spy comedy films
Cold War spy films
Films scored by Jerry Goldsmith
Films about fictional presidents of the United States
Films directed by Gordon Douglas
Films set in Moscow
Films set in New York City
Films set in the Soviet Union
Films set in the Virgin Islands
Films shot in Jamaica
1960s spy comedy films
1967 comedy films
Parody films based on James Bond films
CinemaScope films
1960s English-language films
1960s American films